Ardrahan railway station serves the village of Ardrahan in County Galway, Ireland.

History

Opened by the Athenry and Ennis Junction Railway, at the beginning of the 20th century the station was run by the Great Southern and Western Railway and then Great Southern Railways.

The station was then passed to the Córas Iompair Éireann as a result of the Transport Act 1944 which took effect from 1 January 1945. Passenger services ceased in 1976.

The site today
The line through the station was rebuilt as part of the Western Railway Corridor, the station reopening to passengers in March 2010.

See also 
 List of railway stations in Ireland

References

External links

Irish Rail Ardrahan Station Website

Railway stations opened in 1869
Railway stations closed in 1976
1869 establishments in Ireland
Railway stations in County Galway
Railway stations in the Republic of Ireland opened in the 19th century